The Bellingham Theatre Guild is a community theater located in Bellingham, Washington.  Founded in 1929, the guild has been housed in its current location - the old Congregational Church converted for live theater use - since 1944.

Academy Award-winner Hilary Swank spent some of her early years acting at the guild and in the surrounding community.

References

External links
Official website

Theatre companies in Washington (state)
Bellingham, Washington
Performing groups established in 1929
Tourist attractions in Bellingham, Washington